Loïg Chesnais-Girard (born 25 March 1977) is a French politician. A former member of the Socialist Party, he was mayor of Liffré from 2008 to 2017 and is the current President of the Regional Council of Brittany since 2017.

References

1977 births
Living people
Presidents of the Regional Council of Brittany
Members of the Regional Council of Brittany
21st-century French politicians
Mayors of places in Brittany
Socialist Party (France) politicians
People from Lannion
University of Rennes alumni
Regional councillors of France
Presidents of French regions and overseas collectivities